The Acura TL is an executive car that was manufactured by Acura, the luxury division of Honda. It was introduced in 1995 to replace the Acura Vigor and was badged for the Japanese-market from 1996 to 2000 as the Honda Inspire and from 1996 to 2004 as the Honda Saber. The TL was Acura's best-selling model until it was outsold by the MDX in 2007. In 2005, it ranked as the second best-selling luxury sedan in the United States behind the BMW 3 Series, but sales decreased after the 2008 model year. Four generations of the Acura TL were produced, with the final fourth generation TL premiering in 2008 as a 2009 model and ending production in 2014, when it was replaced together with the TSX by the TLX.

First generation (UA1–UA3; 1996–1998)

The TL "Touring Luxury" debuted as 1996 model, first with the 1996 2.5 TL available with the 2.5 L 176 hp (131 kW) SOHC 20-valve 5-cylinder engine from the Vigor. The 3.2 TL used the 3.2 L 200 hp (149 kW) SOHC 24v V6 from the second generation Acura Legend. The debut of the TL signaled Acura's shift from traditional vehicle names to alphanumeric designations. By replacing recognizable names such as Vigor and Legend with a two-letter designation, the luxury maker hoped to focus consumer attention on the Acura name. The TL was the first Acura model to adopt the new naming scheme.

The 2.5 TL was positioned as the sporty model and the 3.2 focused more upon a luxurious ride. There were minimal styling differences between the two, but the 3.2 TL had larger tires despite the 2.5 TL's more sporty marketing. Moreover, the added power in the 3.2 TL gave it better acceleration. Both engines were mounted in a front-rear, or longitudinal position. This contrasted with the more typical transverse engine mount style, and was intended to provide better weight distribution and reduce nose dive. The engine mount design resulted in an elongated hood for the first generation TL, a shorter front overhang and longer wheelbase, fitting for a near-luxury car. The inline-5 engine in the 2.5 TL competed with similar 5-cylinder engines offered in Audi and Volvo models.

The first 1996 Acura TL was manufactured at Sayama, Japan on March 28, 1995. Sales of the 2.5 TL began in spring 1995, but the 3.2 TL was delayed until fall because of a U.S.-Japan trade dispute. The U.S. government had threatened to impose 100% tariffs on higher-priced Japanese cars in response a growing U.S.-Japan trade deficit. Ultimately a deal was reached which avoided the tariffs.

The first generation Acura TL had standard features including dual airbags, antilock brakes, automatic climate control, a cassette/CD player sound system, and power windows and locks. Leather was standard on the more upscale 3.2 TL, while the 2.5 TL featured a firmer suspension setup. Like its predecessor, the Vigor, this generation TL was a 4-door pillared hardtop, with frameless windows.

1997
In 1997, Acura added a standard power moonroof to all TL models. Additionally, all Acura TLs received a variable-speed intermittent wiper setting. The 3.2 TL had 205/65/15 tires and a V6 motor. The sport-targeted, 5-cylinder 2.5 TL was further fitted with new alloy wheels.

1998
For 1998, Acura made several previously optional features standard on the 2.5 TL. 1998 was the last year of TL production in Japan, as the model was being redesigned for production in the United States.

Second generation (UA4–UA5; 1999–2003)

In 1998, Honda revealed the TL-X concept car, showing a preview of the second-generation TL which would debut in fall that year. The second-generation TL (now called 3.2 TL) was released in 1998 and was now derived off the US-market Honda Accord platform. It was available with a newly designed 3.2 L 225 hp (168 kW) SOHC VTEC J32 V6 mated to a four-speed electronic automatic transmission with SportShift.

The second-generation 3.2 TL (the 2.5 was dropped) was built in Marysville, Ohio, alongside the Honda Accord, at Marysville Auto Plant. These cars were imported into Japan and sold as Honda Inspire in the Honda Clio dealer network, and as Honda Saber in the Honda Verno dealer network. The main difference between the two cars were the front grille; the Inspire and Saber were also available with a 2.5 L Honda J-series V6 exclusive to the Japanese market.

The very first 1999 Acura TL (2G) was assembled on August 4, 1998. The only option on the sedan was a CD-based navigation system. The 1999 TL's navigation system stored the maps in zones; there were 5 different zones for the U.S. Starting with this generation, cabin air filters (also known as pollen filters) were installed as standard equipment and are located behind the glove compartment.

2000

In the second year of production, the Acura TL was given a few more features, including a 5-speed automatic transmission with SportShift. The added gear allowed for slightly better fuel economy and acceleration when compared to the previous 4-speed automatic transmission with SportShift. With this model, if the driver forgets the 1-2 shift the computer will take over when in sport mode and do the 1-2 up and down shifts, unlike the 4-speed 1999 model. In many vehicles, the 5-speed automatic transmission was very unreliable: as the third clutch pack wore, particles blocked off oil passages and prevented the transmission from shifting or holding gears normally. The transmission would slip, fail to shift, or suddenly downshift and make the car come to a screeching halt, even at freeway speeds. This problem was highlighted in the Los Angeles Times in September 2002. Consumer Reports took note and gave the TL and CL the black spot, the worst rating for transmission reliability. A class-action lawsuit was settled to extend the transmission warranty for U.S.A. owners or entities to 7.75 years for all models made from 1998 to 2002 and some 2003 models by VIN; however, Canadian owners warranties were not extended. Transmissions replaced prior to March 2005 usually fail again. Transmissions replaced from March 2005 and later include a redesigned third gear clutch pack reported to fix the problem.

Other notable changes include the addition of side impact airbags for the front passengers and a change of format for the navigation system. The 2000 TL switched from a CD database to a DVD-based navigation system. The entire continental United States became accessible with the navigation system; it was possible to drive from one coast to the other with the new navigation system.

2001

For the 2001 model year, a redesigned coupe version of the TL was introduced, the 3.2CL. While it was mechanically identical to the TL, its sales never came close to that of its sibling model, and as a result, it was discontinued in May 2003. The 2001 model received a redesigned cupholder insert. The automatic transmissions in these cars were also defective. Acura dealers replace the transmissions under warranty. Transmissions replaced prior to March 2005 usually fail again. Transmissions replaced in March 2005 and later include a redesigned third gear clutch pack reported to fix the problem.

Several models in the 2002–2003 years were the subject of a safety recall in July 2009 for injuries reported by faulty driver's side airbag inflators. In February 2010, another recall was issued for the same problem.

2002

In March 2001 for the 2002 model year, the TL got a minor makeover, with a refreshed front fascia, redesigned taillights, a 6 CD in-dash changer as well as a few other features. It also featured  wheels, firmer seats and suspension. A large percentage of these vehicles exhibited problems with the automatic transmission necessitating replacement. Acura dealers replace the transmissions under warranty. Transmissions replaced prior to March 2005 usually fail again. Transmissions replaced March 2005 and later include a redesigned third gear clutch pack reported to fix the problem.

2003
Only minor changes occurred in that year in order to make way for a redesign.

But one odd and notable addition to only the 2003 model year was the addition of General Motors OnStar subscription cellular telephone and navigation assistance service to the DVD GPS navigation system option. These were separate independent systems, each with their own GPS receivers. The OnStar system was based on a dated Motorola analog cellular technology operating over 1G AMPS. Because of this and the failure of Acura to offer a digital upgrade, the TL OnStar system became defunct in 2009 when US carriers were allowed to turn off analog AMPS cell tower equipment.

Third generation (UA6–UA7; 2004–2008)

2004 

In October 2003, the third generation Acura TL (the 3.2 moniker was dropped) was released for sale in North America. Developed mainly in the United States by a team led by Erik Berkman, with bodywork by American Honda designer Jon Ikeda, the new TL was built in Marysville, Ohio, and was derived from the seventh generation US-market Honda Accord. The car itself is praised for its sharp design, and is said to have aged well.

Starting with this generation, this model was not sold in Japan, with the Honda Inspire holding the position of entry level luxury sedan below the Honda Legend in Japan. The Inspire of this era was instead sold as the seventh generation North American spec Honda Accord.

Manual transmission models featured Brembo 4-Piston front brake calipers, a Torsen-type limited slip differential, stiffer anti-roll bars front and rear and performance tires at no additional cost.

As of March 2004, Honda offers to the public a factory-sanctioned "tuner package" version of the TL called the TL A-SPEC. This version features a suspension tuned by Makoto Tamamura, an indication of the TL A-SPEC's aggressive engineering. In addition, an underbody kit, spoiler, limited edition A-SPEC steering wheel, "A-SPEC" badge on the back, and  wheels are standard issue on the A-SPEC package. When installed at purchase, the car's 4 year/  warranty applies to the package as well.

The third generation TL was also the first car in the American market to include a 6-disc DVD-Audio system, output through an 8-speaker 225-watt system, engineered by Panasonic and tuned by Grammy Award-winning sound engineer Elliot Scheiner. The system also plays back regular audio CDs as well as DTS audio discs, CD-Audio, CD-Rs and CD-RWs but not MP3s. In the United States, all models were also equipped with a Bluetooth HandsFree Link (HFL) system, integrated with the audio system, to allow for hands-free usage of one's cell phone (provided the phone also supports Bluetooth and is compatible with the HFL's hands-free profile). In Canada, the HFL feature was not available on the base model (standard with A-Spec, Technology, and Navigation packages), though the 2005 model year saw HFL becoming standard in all Canadian models. With the built-in XM Radio tuner, owners can elect to pay a monthly subscription after the complimentary 3 months subscription expires from Acura for XM radio, which provides over 100 digital channels via satellite.

With the optional Alpine-designed navigation system, the third generation TL can also accept voice commands like "find nearest police station" or "go home." The DVD navigation system features an  touchscreen LCD, which allows for easy viewing of the road ahead. DVDs with new road information for the navigation system were made annually until 2014.

The JDM Honda Inspire debuted around four and a half months earlier (on June 11, 2003) and marked the branching out of the TL line from the Inspire. The Inspire is basically a seventh-generation US-market Honda Accord V6 with minor trim changes, and the addition of Variable Cylinder Management, which shuts off half of the engine when not needed to boost fuel economy. The Saber was discontinued and the new Inspire is being sold at Clio, Primo, and Verno dealerships.

The TL became Acura's best-selling luxury sedan in 2004 with more than 79,000 sold that year.

The Insurance Institute for Highway Safety (IIHS) found the Acura TL had the second lowest fatality rates among midsize luxury cars.

2005
The 2005 TL received a passenger airbag cut-off switch and indicator and extra stitching on the front seats. There were several minor changes made (such as changes in seat belt anchor mounts) which are not published.

2006

The 2006 TL received the Tire Pressure Monitoring System (TPMS) and a new engine management system to help reduce torque steer.

2007

The 2007 Acura TL features a slightly revised exterior as well as a revised interior with a new steering wheel, redesigned gauges, and footwell lighting, in addition to new interior and exterior colors. The 2007 TL (non Type-S) received suspension changes to improve ride comfort. Also new for the 2007 model year were LED turn signal repeaters on the side mirrors and fog lamps in the bumper. Prior to 2007, the fog lamps were integrated into the headlight housing; Daytime Running Lights now occupy that space (Canadian models have had DRLs there rather than fog lamps since 2004).

TL with navigation models sport a new rear view camera with image displayed on the navigation screen as well as XM NavTraffic. In addition to the new standard auxiliary audio jack, the sound system is now MP3/WMA compatible and offers Dolby Pro Logic II decoding and speed-sensitive volume compensation. The manual transmission option had been dropped from the base TL due largely to extremely low sales (roughly 1 out of 40 TLs sold across America were equipped with a manual gearbox).

The most notable revision is the return of the Type-S edition of the TL. The manual transmission includes a limited slip differential. Exterior differences include quad exhaust pipes, restyled rear lamps and front fascia, lip spoiler, wider side sills, Brembo brakes, dark silver 10-spoke wheels, a "black chrome" grille rather than the standard glossy grille, and exclusive Type-S badging, plus an exclusive new color option, Kinetic Blue Pearl. The interior has Type-S badging on the steering wheel and headrests, more highly bolstered front seats, two-tone seats (only with the Ebony/Silver interior), metal racing pedals, carbon fiber trim, and red interior lighting (as opposed to blue in the base TL). Touch screen navigation is standard and the suspension has been firmed up. The only options are the aforementioned transmission and high performance summer tires (Bridgestone Potenzas) rather than the standard all-season tires (Michelin Pilot MXM4s).

Acura also introduced a new 5-speed automatic transmission for the 2007 and 2008 model year TLs. Changes include downshift "rev matching", slightly altered gear ratios, and a different bellhousing. The transmission is identical between the base model and Type-S. The block on the base model's 3.2-liter engine was changed to accommodate for the new bellhousing.

2008
The 2008 TL features an improved new immobilizer system, and a separate Tire Pressure Monitoring System (TPMS) warning lamp. The navigation system has been updated to work in Hawaii, and the AcuraLink satellite capability has been expanded to incorporate 76 markets (up from 38 markets for the 2007 model).

Performance

Zero to : (3.5L V6) 5.7sec, (3.2L V6 MT) 5.9sec & (3.2L V6 AT) 6 sec
Zero to : 10.9 sec
Zero to : 19.6 sec

Standing -mile (~400 m): 14.1 sec @ 
Top speed (governor limited): 
Braking, 70–0 mph: 
Roadholding, -dia skidpad: 0.93 g

Awards
 The 2006 Acura TL won ConsumerSearch's "Sports sedan with luxury touches" in Luxury Cars Reviews in September 2006.
 The 2006 Acura TL won ConsumerSearch's "Best blend of sport and luxury" in its list of Sports Sedan Reviews in June 2006.

Fourth generation (UA8–UA9; 2009–2014) 

The first fourth-generation Acura TL rolled off the assembly line on September 23, 2008. Debuted for the 2009 model year, the Acura TL featured a more aggressive interpretation of Acura's latest styling vocabulary, known as "Keen Edge Dynamic." Featured prominently on the front is Acura's controversial "Power Plenum" upper grille. The car is also  longer overall,  wider and  taller. Structural rigidity was increased due to the use of high-strength steel in 47.6 percent of the chassis.

SH-AWD ("Super Handling" All Wheel Drive) is a multi-vectoring all wheel drive system designed more for performance than for simply providing traction in adverse circumstances. While cruising, the system sends 90% of the power to the front wheels and 10% to the rear wheels. Acceleration puts more torque on the rear wheels. The car can put up to 70% of the total available power to the rear wheels to assist with rapid acceleration, and of that 70%, 100% can be pushed to either the left or right wheel in order to assist the vehicle through a corner.

The brakes on the new TL have been increased in size, from the older  front disc and  rear disc to the now Ridgeline-sized  front discs and  rear disc, still incorporating an internal rear drum e-brake while maintaining hydraulic discs for the foot applied brakes. The bolt pattern on the car is no longer a 5 x  but a 5 x  for this generation.

The SH-AWD model also includes some interior refinements over the base model and is tuned for slightly firmer suspension and steering feedback. It is visually distinguishable from the base model on the exterior by its SH-AWD badge on the trunk, quad exhaust pipes (as opposed to dual exhaust on the base model) and larger air ducts in the front bumper to cool the larger brakes (the base model's turn signal indicators in the bumper extend all the way to the center.) The TL rides on 245/50R17 tires, while the TL SH-AWD has 245/45R18 tires with optional 245/40ZR19 summer performance tires. Both models use electric power steering rather than hydraulic, and a revised five-speed automatic transmission (2012+ models received the 6-speed automatic) featuring shift paddles on the steering wheel is standard equipment for both models.

For the 2010 model year, Acura announced that a 6-speed close-ratio manual transmission would be available for the SH-AWD model. For this manual transmission model, Acura designed a new self-adjusting dual-mass clutch system for increased holding power and improved modulation compared to the previous generation. Additional differences from the automatic transmission SH-AWD model include more aggressively tuned front dampers and springs, stiffer engine and transmission mounts, unique Electric Power Steering (EPS) tuning, hill start assist, and improved front/rear weight distribution.

The fourth generation Acura TL adds further electronic convenience items, now including a central multifunction display, an eight-speaker 276-watt audio system with a six-disc CD changer, XM Satellite Radio, USB port connectivity (including full iPod control support), and Bluetooth Audio (for streaming music from a cell phone). Both models offer an optional Technology Package, which includes premium Milano leather seats; Keyless Access ( unlock the doors, and start the engine without ever having to use your key, as long as it's in your pocket or purse, or within range of the vehicle.), a joystick-based (no longer touchscreen) navigation system updated with a new  full VGA display and the ability to provide weather information and traffic-based rerouting, and the Acura/ELS audio system with 10 speakers, 440 watts of power, DTS CD compatibility for 5.1 surround sound, DVD-A, as well as an internal hard drive with 13 GB of storage dedicated for audio. With the ELS audio system, audio CDs are automatically ripped to the hard drive upon insertion for future playback. The navigation system also stores its map data on the hard drive (as opposed to the previous model's DVD-based storage), producing faster boot times.

Technology Package

Audio

Hard Drive
13GB
Only the contents of an Audio CD may be ripped to the HDD. Copying to the HDD from other recordable media or storage devices is not supported.
Album, Title and Artist information is provided by an updatable Gracenote file.

USB
FAT32 Format Supported
Limited to 700 folders existing at the root of the storage device. Folder names appear as album names. Sub-folder navigation is not supported.
Limited to 15,000 files

2012

For the 2012 model, Honda offered new front and rear styling on the Acura TL. Acura updated the controversial "beak" insert in the front grille, replacing it with a smaller insert that flows better with the headlights and creates a sleeker profile. Aside from cosmetic changes, the 2012 TL was equipped with Honda's 6-speed automatic transmission to improve performance and efficiency. This transmission features downshift rev-matching with throttle blip and the ability to downshift two gears at a time. Additional new features include ventilated seats, new 60GB HDD, blind-spot information system, and upgraded wheels. The 2012 TL retains both the base 3.5L   and the SH-AWD models' 3.7L   engines but now gets two mpg more in the city (20 mpg) and three mpg more on the highway (29 mpg), thanks to less engine friction and the 6-speed automatic transmission. The 6-speed manual transmission will continue to be offered. The 2012 model is also 3dB quieter on the highway.

2013 Acura TL Special Edition
It is a version of front-wheel-drive 2013 Acura TL with distinctive 10-spoke 18-inch alloy wheels, a color-matched deck lid spoiler, trunk-mounted Special Edition badging, Keyless Access System with Keyless Access Remote, pushbutton start, choice of 4 body colors (Bellanova White Pearl, Crystal Black Pearl, Graphite Luster Metallic and Silver Moon Metallic) matched with an Ebony interior leather upholstery with contrast stitching, Sequential SportShift 6-speed automatic transmission with paddle shifter system, 10-way adjustable power driver's seat, an 8-way adjustable power front passenger's seat, power moonroof, 276-watt audio system with eight speakers, dual-zone dual-mode automatic climate control system with automatic humidity control. The vehicle was produced using domestically and globally sourced parts at Honda of America Mfg., Inc., in Marysville, Ohio.

Safety
The Acura TL uses Honda's Advanced Compatibility Engineering front end. The Insurance Institute for Highway Safety (IIHS) found the 2009-11 front-wheel drive TL models (SH-AWD models not included in study) to have an overall driver death of five deaths per million registered years.

* vehicle structure rated "Acceptable"

Production

Honda announced it was replacing the TL with a new Acura TLX sedan. Production of the TL ceased towards the end of 2014, with the replacement model 2015 TLX going on sale in the fall of that same year.

Sales figures

References

 2004 Acura TL A-spec  "2004 Acura TL A-SPEC: No assembly required to enjoy this factory-spec tuner package", an article by John Kiewicz on page 136 of the March 2004 issue of Motor Trend
 "Honda's Unexpected Gear Shift", an article by John O'Dell in the September 11, 2002 edition of the Los Angeles Times

External links

 Acura USA - Official Site
 Acura TL - Official US Site

TL
Cars introduced in 1995
2000s cars
2010s cars
Compact executive cars
Sedans
Front-wheel-drive vehicles
All-wheel-drive vehicles
Motor vehicles manufactured in the United States